Senior Minister is a political title. It may refer to:

Senior Minister of Canada, a political office in the Cabinet of Canada
Senior Minister, a ceremonial position before the title Deputy Prime Minister was introduced in 1977
Senior Minister of Malaysia, a political office in the Cabinet of Malaysia
Senior Minister of Punjab (Pakistan), a political office in the Government of Punjab
Senior Minister of Singapore, a political office in the Cabinet of Singapore

See also
 Minister of Seniors